Alexander Ian Kirkpatrick (25 July 1930 – 18 November 2012) was a South African rugby union player, who played international rugby for his country on 13 occasions from 1953 to 1961. In his home country he is best known as a coach, where he led Griqualand West to victory in the Currie Cup in 1970, and in 1978 took on the role as the director of coaching for the South African Rugby Board.

Notes

1930 births
2012 deaths
South Africa international rugby union players
South African rugby union players
South African rugby union coaches
Rugby union centres
Griquas (rugby union) players
Rugby union players from Bloemfontein